Joseph or Joe Devlin may refer to:

 Joseph Devlin (1871–1934), Irish journalist and nationalist politician
 Joe Devlin (American football) (born 1954), American football offensive tackle
 Joe Devlin (footballer) (born 1927), retired Scottish professional footballer 
 Jack Devlin (Australian politician) (1900–1957), aka Joseph Devlin, Australian politician
 Joe Devlin (actor) (1894–1973), American actor